Moose cheese is cheese created from moose milk. Varieties of moose cheese are produced in Sweden by Christer and Ulla Johansson at their location called "Moose House" or "Elk House". Three varieties of moose cheese are produced.

Overview
The Elk House (Älgens Hus) farm in Bjurholm, Sweden, run by Christer and Ulla Johansson, is believed to be the world's only producer of moose cheese. It has three milk-producing moose, whose milk yields roughly 300 kilograms of cheese per year; the cheese sells for about US$1,000 per kilogram (approximately US$455 per pound).

Three varieties of cheese are produced: a rind-style, a blue and a feta-style.

The cheese is served at the Älgens Hus' restaurant, located in Sweden.

Moose Cheese also produced by GamEat from Russia by cheese maker Alexander Fursin

See also

List of cheeses

References

Cheeses by animal's milk
Cheese
Swedish cheeses